Patricio Alejandro Pérez Díaz (born March 14, 1980 in Rengo, Chile) is a Chilean footballer currently playing for Cobresal of the Primera División in Chile.

Teams
  San Luis Quillota 2005-2006
  Everton 2007
  Unión San Felipe 2007-2009
  Cobreloa 2010
  San Luis Quillota 2010
  Rangers 2011
  Cobresal 2011
  Coquimbo Unido 2012
  San Luis 2013–2014

Titles
  Unión San Felipe 2009 (Primera B Championship and Copa Chile)

References
 
 

1980 births
Living people
People from Rengo
Chilean footballers
San Luis de Quillota footballers
Everton de Viña del Mar footballers
Unión San Felipe footballers
Cobreloa footballers
Rangers de Talca footballers
Cobresal footballers
Coquimbo Unido footballers
Chilean Primera División players
Primera B de Chile players
Association football midfielders